Shobha Rao is an American novelist, having immigrated from India. She won the 2014 Katherine Anne Porter Prize, is a recipient of the Elizabeth George Foundation fellowship, and has been anthologized in The Best American Short Stories 2015.

Writing and reception 
Rao's debut novel, Girls Burn Brighter, has been praised for its "sustained and elegant prose", though USA Today said that the "empowering message gets lost in the overheated language and imagery"; the review concluded that once "Rao learns to dial down the melodrama, she’ll be a formidable writer". Another reviewer calls Rao "a natural storyteller". Rao's other work, An Unrestored Woman, is a short story collection that was called "a breathless and fascinating read".

A theme throughout Rao's works is oppression, especially of women.

Works 
 An Unrestored Woman. Flatiron Books 2016. , 
 Girls Burn Brighter. New York, N.Y. : Flatiron Books, 2018. ,

References

External links

Official site

Living people
Year of birth missing (living people)